General Cliff Rock Paintings or Jiangjunya Petroglyphs, also known as Jiangjunya Rock Paintings, are images carved into the rocks of the General Cliff (将军崖), located in Jinping, 14 kilometers far west from Lianyungang.

Discovery and research
The site of General Cliff Rock Paintings was discovered in 1979. In the 1980s, people found three petroglyphs of several square meters in the suburb of General Cliff in Lianyungang, Jiangsu, which were then hailed as "Oriental Book from Heaven" (东方天书) because of their obscure contents. 

Many experts and scholars have confirmed that the rock paintings of the General Cliff are Neolithic works, which has become a consensus in Chinese historiography circle, but there are different speculations on the makers of these rock paintings, the time of production, the meanings of the images and the specific purposes.

One view is that the General Cliff Rock Paintings are about 10,000 years old, and are the oldest rock paintings ever discovered in China.

Conservation
In 1988, the site of General Cliff Rock Paintings was included in the third batch of the list of Major Historical and Cultural Site Protected at the National Level by the State Council of the People's Republic of China.

References

Petroglyphs
Major National Historical and Cultural Sites in Jiangsu
Historic sites in China
Archaeological sites in China
Cultural heritage of China